The Ukrainian gudgeon (Gobio sarmaticus) is a species of gudgeon, a small freshwater fish in the family Cyprinidae. It is widespread in the lower parts of Dniester and Southern Bug drainages in Ukraine and Moldova. It is also likely to be present in the lower Dnieper River. It is a freshwater demersal fish, and grows up to 13 cm length.

References

 

Gobio
Fish described in 1949
Freshwater fish of Europe
Taxa named by Lev Berg